Pygocentrus piraya, often called the piraya piranha or San Francisco piranha, and sometimes sold as the man-eating piranha, is a large, aggressive piranha from the São Francisco River basin in Brazil.

Description
It is one of the largest piranhas, reaching a maximum length of 50 cm in the wild, and is sometimes considered the most beautiful, with its orange to yellow belly coloration, silver eyes, and rayed fibrous adipose fin. Like most other piranhas, P. piraya is laterally compressed and roughly circular in profile, and bears a mouthful of very sharp teeth. The lower jaw is thick, strong, and protruding.

Names
It is known by many vernacular names, such as Rio São Francisco piranha, black-tailed piranha, and king emperor piranha, and locally it is simply termed piraya.

Diet
This fish is an omnivore, but when hungry, stressed, or seeking live food it is very aggressive. This characteristic combined with its large size make it a danger to humans. Piranha attacks on humans are anecdotal for the most part. The piraya prefers to eat small fish and insects, along with seeds and aquatic plant material.

In captivity
The piraya is sometimes available as an aquarium fish. It is not generally bred in captivity, so aquarium pirayas are usually imported from South America and can be expensive. Any other fish sharing a tank with a piraya should be of the same or a similar piranha species. Other types of fish will be attacked and eaten.

References

Serrasalmidae
Piranhas
Fish of the São Francisco River basin
Endemic fauna of Brazil
Fish described in 1819
Taxa named by Georges Cuvier